Professional Management Group (PMG) is India's first sports management company  started in 1985 by Sunil Gavaskar and Sumedh Shah. 

PMG offers diverse services in the field of sports. Though PMG has been closely associated with cricket, it also has services in other sports such as golf, squash, horse racing, hockey, bodybuilding, archery, and water sports.

In the late 1980s, to establish business, PMG started promoting the Indian sports industry through mediums like print, television and events. 

PMG produced sports programmes for television channels like Doordarshan, DD Metro, STAR Sports and ZEE Network and the highest selling VHS cassette on cricket, Best of One Day Cricket, for Citibank. The company also produced the first and highest selling cookery cassette NESTLE Food Talk Show and the first ever interactive CD ROM and hosted a website on WILLS World Cup 1996.

PMG managed the CEAT International Cricket Awards, the Indian Cricket Awards and the first All India Club Golf Tournament for McDowells.

Sponsorship and syndication of print columns
The concept of the sponsored syndicated column was created by PMG in 1986. This concept had not been used before in India.

The idea behind the sponsored syndicated column is that a top level national or international sportsperson writes a column which is then sponsored by an advertiser and syndicated to newspapers throughout the country by PMG. The newspapers get columns written by top-level sportsmen whom they cannot afford to pay if the column was not syndicated and sponsored and readers of even small papers get to know the views of national and international sportsmen.

References

External links
Times of India
ceatcricketrating
Castrol
Castrol

Companies based in Mumbai
Indian companies established in 1985
1985 establishments in Maharashtra
Sports management companies